Arbatsky (masculine), Arbatskaya (feminine), or Arbatskoye (neuter) may refer to:
Arbatskaya (Arbatsko-Pokrovskaya line), a station on the Arbatsko-Pokrovskaya line of the Moscow Metro, Moscow, Russia
Arbatskaya (Filyovskaya line), a station on the Filyovskaya line of the Moscow Metro, Moscow, Russia
Arbatskaya Square, a square in central Moscow
Arbatskaya Spit, common misspelling of Arabat Spit

See also
 Arbat (disambiguation)